Time Out is a studio album by the American jazz group the Dave Brubeck Quartet, released in 1959 on Columbia Records. The album is a subtle blend of cool and West Coast jazz.

The album peaked at No. 2 on the Billboard pop albums chart, and was the first jazz album to sell a million copies. The single "Take Five" off the album was also the first jazz single to sell one million copies. By 1963, the record had sold 500,000 units, and in 2011 it was certified double platinum by the RIAA, signifying over two million records sold. The album was inducted in the Grammy Hall of Fame in 2009.

The album was selected, in 2005, for preservation in the United States National Recording Registry by the Library of Congress as being "culturally, historically, or aesthetically significant".

Background

On the condition that Brubeck's group first record a conventional album of traditional songs of the American South, Gone with the Wind, Columbia president Goddard Lieberson took a chance to underwrite and release Time Out. It received negative reviews by critics upon its release. It produced a Top 40 hit single in "Take Five", composed by Paul Desmond, and the one track not written by Dave Brubeck.

Although the theme of Time Out is non-common-time signatures, things are not quite so simple. The title is a play on Mozart's "Rondo alla Turca" from his Piano Sonata No. 11, and reflects the fact that the band heard the rhythm while traveling in Turkey.

"Strange Meadow Lark" begins with a piano solo that exhibits no clear time signature, but then settles into a fairly ordinary  swing once the rest of the group joins. "Take Five" is in  throughout. According to Desmond, "It was never supposed to be a hit. It was supposed to be a Joe Morello drum solo." "Everybody's Jumpin'" is mainly in a very flexible , while "Pick Up Sticks" firms that up into a clear and steady .

In an article for The Independent, Spencer Leigh speculated that "Kathy's Waltz" inspired the song "All My Loving", written by Paul McCartney, credited to Lennon/McCartney, and performed by the Beatles, as they share similar rhythmic endings to the last phrases of their melodies.

Legacy
The Dave Brubeck Quartet followed up Time Out with three more similarly-named albums that also made use of uncommon time signatures: Time Further Out (1961), Countdown—Time in Outer Space (1962) and Time Changes (1964). Another album, Time In (1966), which featured the quartet but was credited only to Brubeck, echoed the title of Time Out, although it made use of more conventional time signatures.

In 2005, Time Out was one of 50 recordings chosen that year by the Library of Congress to be added to the National Recording Registry. It was also listed that year in the book 1001 Albums You Must Hear Before You Die. In 2009 the album was inducted into the Grammy Hall of Fame.

Reissues
In 1997, the album was remastered for compact disc by Legacy Recordings.

In 2009 Legacy Recordings released a special three-disc 50th Anniversary Edition of Time Out. This edition offers a much higher dynamic range than the 1997 remaster. In addition to the complete album, the Legacy Edition includes a bonus disc featuring previously unreleased concert recordings of the same Brubeck Quartet from the 1961, 1963, and 1964 gatherings of Newport Jazz Festival. The Legacy Edition's third disc is a DVD featuring a 30-minute interview with Brubeck in 2003, and an interactive "piano lesson" where the viewer can toggle through four different camera angles of Brubeck performing a solo version of "Three to Get Ready".

In 2020, the album Time OutTakes was released, which was overseen by Brubeck's children and released on their own record label, Brubeck Editions. The album features alternate takes of "Blue Rondo a la Turk", "Strange Meadowlark", "Take Five", "Three To Get Ready" and "Kathy's Waltz" (now billed as "Cathy's Waltz"), as well as two songs from the same sessions that had not been included on the album: a cover of "I'm In a Dancing Mood" (which Brubeck had previously covered, live and on the album Dave Brubeck and Jay & Kai at Newport) and "Watusi Jam" (a take on Brubeck's composition "Watusi Drums"). The release was chosen as a Critics Pick by The New York Times.

Track listing

Personnel
The Dave Brubeck Quartet
 Dave Brubeck – piano
 Paul Desmond – alto saxophone
 Eugene Wright – bass
 Joe Morello – drums

Production
 Teo Macero – producer
 Pat Maher - engineer
 Fred Plaut – engineer
 S. Neil Fujita – cover artwork
 Seth Rothstein – project director
 Russell Gloyd – reissue producer
 Mark Wilder – reissue remastering
 Cozbi Sanchez-Cabrera – reissue art direction

Charts
Album
Billboard (United States)

Time Out peaked at No. 2 the week of November 27, 1961 on the Billboard Monaural LPs chart, behind only Judy at Carnegie Hall by Judy Garland.

Singles
Billboard (United States)

Sales and certifications

Time Out was the first jazz album to sell more than a million copies. The album was certified platinum in 1997 and double platinum in 2011. The single, "Take Five", also sold over a million.

References

External links
 The Dave Brubeck Quartet: Time Out – by A. B. Spellman and Murray Horwitz; part of NPR's Basic Jazz Record Library
Time Out: How Dave Brubeck Changed Jazz

1959 albums
Albums produced by Teo Macero
Albums recorded at CBS 30th Street Studio
Columbia Records albums
Concept albums
Cool jazz albums
Dave Brubeck albums
United States National Recording Registry recordings
Album covers by S. Neil Fujita
United States National Recording Registry albums